The first season of The Ultimate Dance Battle  premiered in spring of 2011 on Dutch station RTL5 and Belgian station 2BE.  The show was hosted by Sean D'Hondt and Lieke van Lexmond.  Dan Karaty also presented in-part in his role as head judge. The first season's choreographers/contestants were Laurent Flament, Isabelle Beernaert, Shaker, Rinus Sprong, and team Koen Brouwers with Fame Jana de Haan.  After ten weeks of competition Beernaert was announced winner in a May 6 finale and won one-half of the  €50,000  prize package, with the remainder split amongst the five dancers on her team.

Dance Camp Rounds

Dancers

Round 1 
 Challenge: Choreographer's Style
 Winner: Heart2Beat and Team Rinus
 Evaluation: Dan Karaty

 Switch: Team Rinus switched Charlene for Jomecia (of Team Shaker). Heart2Beat won a challenge as well, but its coach, Isabelle, chose not to trade any dancers.

Round 2 
 Challenge:
 Team Rinus: Hip-hop
 Team Shaker: Modern
 Heart2Beat: Latin
 Team Koen & Roemjana: Jazz
 Team Laurent: Hip-hop
 Winner: Team Koen & Roemjana
 Evaluation: Karaty joined by Euvgenia Parakhina.

 Switch: Team Koen & Roemjana traded Patrick for Alessandro (of Team Shaker)

Round 3 
 Challenge: Win over a marketing team for chewing-gum brand.
 Winner: Team Koen & Roemjana
 Evaluation: Dan Karaty and marketing team

 Switch: no dancer traded.

Elimination Chart

Live Shows

Live Show 1 
 Opening:
 Group Choreography: "Requiem for a dream" (Soundtrack) — Clint Mansell (choreography: Roy Julen)

 Final Battle:
 Team Shaker
 Team Koen & Roemjana
 Music: "Hello" — Martin Solveig feat. Dragonette
 Winner: Team Koen & Roemjana

Live Show 2 
 Opening:
 Group Choreography: "Sweat" — David Guetta feat. Snoop Dogg (choreography: Roy Julen)

 Final Battle:
 Team Koen & Roemjana
 Team Rinus
 Music: "Yeah 3x" — Chris Brown
 Winner: Team Rinus

Live Show 3 (semi-final) 
 Opening:
 Group Choreography: "Jar of Hearts" — Christina Perri (choreography: Roy Julen)

 Final Battle:
 Team Laurent
 Team Rinus
 Music: "Sexy Bitch" — David Guetta feat. Akon
 Winner: Team Rinus

Live Show 4 (finale) 
 Opening:
 Group Choreography (All 5 teams): "C'mon" — Tiësto vs. Diplo feat. Busta Rhymes (choreography: Dan Karaty)

 Final Battle:
 Team Isabelle
 Team Rinus
 Music: "Give me everything" — Ne-Yo feat. Pitbull
 Winner: Team Isabelle

Viewing Figures 

2011 Belgian television seasons
2011 Dutch television seasons